Mark "Monk" Hubbard (October 27, 1970 – June 8, 2018) was a skateboarder, artist, skatepark builder, and founder of Grindline Skateparks.

Early life 
Hubbard was born in West Seattle in 1970 and received his first skateboard in 1975 for his fifth birthday.

Skatepark building 
In regards to skateparks, Hubbard believed in DIY skate spots and building one's own skateboarding paradise, stating that there is nothing that compares to riding an obstacle you've built. Monk was involved in the Burnside Skatepark project.

Grindline Skateparks 
On January 26, 2000 Monk founded Grindline Skateparks. As of 2015, Grindline had built over 300 parks across the world. During his life, Hubbard helped design and build hundreds of skate parks. Some consider Monk to be the originator of the modern skate park design.

Wounded Knee 4-Directions Toby Eagle Bull Memorial Skatepark 
Hubbard was part of the core group, alongside Pine Ridge Native Walt Pourier, Jim Murphy, and Jeff Ament, that originated the idea to build the Wounded Knee 4-Directions Toby Eagle Bull Memorial Skatepark on the Pine Ridge Indian Reservation. Grindline designed and constructed the skatepark, completing the park in 2011.

Skatepark Highway System 
In 2015, Hubbard predicted a future where major cities provide a skatepark system highway, intentionally connecting the skateparks.

References

External links 

 MARK “MONK” HUBBARD – A PILLAR OF CONCRETE SKATEPARK BUILDING - interview 2018 - Juice Magazine
Mark Hubbard Remembered - Thrasher

American skateboarders
2018 deaths
1970 births